D is the sixth single album by South Korean band Big Bang, and the third from their Made Series.

Background
The first poster of D was released on June 26, with the name of the title track, and the date of album release. The second poster with the second title track was released on the next day June 27. The two new songs were released on July 1, and the physical album will be released on the 7th. The release is supported by a live countdown on Naver Starcast on 30 June, 11 pm.

Commercial performance
In less than 20 hours D sold over 500,000 copies in China. In only three days the album sold over 650,000 in China, making a record of the fastest selling album in China. After only 9 days the album sold over 800,000 copies and become the best selling album for Bigbang in China. Both singles sold over half million copies in the first week in South Korea. On August 1, 2016 the album reached 1 million digital sales in China. As of March 2017, the album has sold over 1.3 million copies on QQ Music, making it one of the best-selling digital albums in Chinese history.

It charted at number one on the Gaon Album Chart on July 16, the album sold on July 89,017 copies. In Japan the album debuted at number 16, with total 4,917 copies sold.

On YouTube, the video included on billboard's Most Viewed K-Pop Videos in America & Around the World in June, peaking No.9 on both America and World, with only counting less than 24 hours views.

Reception
Before the releasing of the singles Tablo from Epik High called "If You" breathtaking, while "Sober" a song that "kicks asses". Yang Hyun-suk named "If You" the saddest song that BIGBANG has ever made.

Billboard talked about "If You", saying that it was the "band's most instantly striking pieces in years." Osen talked about the mix between fun and sadness in the album, and how only BigBang can make it work, "Utmost tenderness and fun and exciting feelings are all mixed together in the song. Following the BIGBANG style but new, it was the pinnacle of BIGBANG style.", they called "If You" "is the saddest song ever in BIGBANG's history" and "Sober", "a song that everyone can enjoy cheerfully."

G-Dragon received good reviews for his writing, "G-Dragon shows of his formidible  songwriting chops, evoking the complexity of "Lies" or "Haru Haru"." Also calling D one of the best releases from MADE Series.

Promotion
The first live performance was during their Made Tour in Bangkok, Thailand on July 11, 2015.

Track listing

Charts

Weekly charts

Monthly charts

Year-end charts

Sales

Release history

References

External links
 
Big Bang Official Website

BigBang (South Korean band) albums
2015 albums
YG Entertainment albums
Avex Group albums
Korean-language albums
Single albums
Albums produced by Teddy Park
Albums produced by G-Dragon